William Nosworthy Churchill (1796–1846) was a British-born journalist who moved to Turkey aged 19 and was founder of the Ceride-i Havadis newspaper. He was the cause of a diplomatic incident which resulted in temporary severance of diplomatic relations between the United Kingdom and the Ottoman Empire.

Early life
He was born in London on 7 November 1796, the son of Frederick Henry Churchill (1759–1840) of Exeter and Dorothy (née Nosworthy) (1768–1846) of Crediton, Devon.

Biography
In 1815 aged 19 he went to Turkey, possibly as a foreign correspondent of the English Morning Herald newspaper, and settled in Smyrna (İzmir). In 1824 he married Beatrix Belhomme (1803–1895) daughter of a French merchant, with whom he had 11 children including Alfred Black (1826–1870), Henry Adrian (1828–1886) explorer and diplomat, and William an artist.

He later moved to Istanbul where he was known as a wood merchant.

Diplomatic Service 

He worked as a dragoman (interpreter) at the US Consulate and in 1831 was appointed American Vice-Consul, then in 1833 was Acting Consul and then recommended to be Consul following the resignation of the former incumbent, but he was not appointed and in April 1834 he was dismissed and instructed to hand over the Consulate archives and the balance of funds in his hands. Churchill stated that he had been defamed by a known perpetrator, and asked the American President for an inquiry.

The 'Churchill Affair' 

In 1836 while hunting in Kadıköy, a large residential district of Constantinople, he accidentally shot and wounded the son of Necati Efendi, a civil servant holding a high position in the Title Deed Office. Churchill was arrested, savagely beaten, and imprisoned while the boy's injuries were being assessed. His eventual release obtained through the intervention of the British Ambassador Lord Ponsonby caused a diplomatic incident resulting in the dismissal of Akif Pasha, the Minister of Foreign Affairs, and temporary severance of diplomatic relations between the United Kingdom and the Ottoman Empire. In compensation for his detention Churchill was handsomely compensated with an award of the Nişan-i İftihar (Order of Glory, the second highest decoration in the Ottoman Empire), a settlement of 400,000 piastres  (then a very substantial sum), and trade concessions including the export of ten thousand Ottoman gallons of olive oil.

Newspaper proprietor 

Having previously worked as an interpreter, Churchill was familiar with the Turkish language and the Ottoman Turkish script and in 1840 published the Ceride-i Havadis (Journal of News), a weekly newspaper which received financial support from the government. Ceride-i Havadis published foreign news items translated by Churchill and his staff, and was the first and only semi-private paper in Turkey until 1860.

He died in Constantinople on 7 September 1846 aged 49 and was buried in the Feriköy Protestant Cemetery.

He was succeeded as publisher of the Ceride-i Havadis by his son Alfred Black who went to Sevastopol during the Crimean War to cover the fighting for English newspapers, and his reports were also published in special supplements by the Ceride-i Havadis. In 1860 Alfred Churchill also established a daily version of the newspaper, :tr:Ruzname-i Ceride-i Havadis which was the first Turkish newspaper to be published on a daily basis during the Ottoman period.
After his death in 1870 aged 45 the business continued until 1887 when the papers closed.

Further reading
Cumhuriyet öncesi ve sonrası Matbaa ve Basın Sanayii, Istanbul 1998, p. 62
 Un diplomat Ottoman en 1836 (Affaire Churchill), Arthur Alric, Paris 1892
Lord Ponsonby and the Churchill Affair of 1836: An Episode in the Eastern Question, Joseph M Fewster, Diplomacy and Statecraft; issue 9.2
Kadıköy’de çocuk vuran serhoş İngiliz’i gazete çıkartma izni ile ödüllendirmiştik, Murat Bardakçı; Haberturk. Erişim tarihi: (20 April 2014)
 The Levantines and their Legacy in the Ottoman Newspaper Press: a Case Study about William Nosworthy Churchill, presentation by Birten Çelik (Middle East Technical University) at the Levantine Heritage Foundation Conference,London, November 2016

References

1796 births
1846 deaths
Journalists from London